The 1984 Penn Quakers football team was an American football team that represented the University of Pennsylvania during the 1984 NCAA Division I-AA football season. After two years of shared championships, Penn won the Ivy League outright in 1984.

In their fourth year under head coach Jerry Berndt, the Quakers compiled an 8–1 record and outscored opponents 286 to 152. Lal Heneghan and Kevin Bradley were the team captains.

Penn's undefeated (7–0) conference record topped the Ivy League standings. The Quakers outscored Ivy opponents 254 to 90. It was the first time since 1970 that any team had gone undefeated in Ivy League play.

The Quakers' only loss came in an away game against a non-league, Division I-A opponent, Army. Despite beating every Division I-AA opponent it faced, Penn did not appear in the weekly top 20 national rankings.

Penn played its home games at Franklin Field adjacent to the university's campus in Philadelphia, Pennsylvania.

Schedule

References

Penn
Penn Quakers football seasons
Ivy League football champion seasons
Penn Quakers football